After the 2013 general election, and the coming into effect of the new constitution, provinces became defunct and the country was now divided into 47 counties. Each county has its own government and therefore there is no central regional capital. Western Province became the Western region, comprising four counties: Kakamega, Bungoma, Vihiga, and Busia.

Kakamega is the seat of government for Kakamega County, Bungoma County has its seat in Bungoma town, Busia County has the Assemble in Busia, Vihiga County in Vihiga town, all the County governments and governors are answerable to the people not to the national government.
The Western Region of Kenya, bordering Uganda, is one of former Kenya's seven administrative provinces outside Nairobi. It is west of the Eastern Rift Valley and is inhabited mainly by the Luhya people. Quakerism is widely practised here. Kenya's second highest mountain, Mount Elgon is located in Bungoma County. The Kakamega Forest rainforest is part of the area. The province capital was the town of Kakamega.

Geography 
Western Region has diverse physical features, from the hills of northern Bungoma County to the plains bordering Lake Victoria in Busia County. The highest point in the Western Region of Kenya is the peak of Mount Elgon, while the lowest point is the town of Busia on the water at Lake Victoria.  In 1999 the total population was of 3,358,776 inhabitants within an area of 8,361 km², increasing to 4.334 million for the 2009 decennial census.

Climate 
The climate is mainly tropical, with variations due to altitude. Kakamega County is mainly hot and wet most of the year, while Bungoma County is colder but just as wet. Busia County is the warmest, while the hilly Vihiga County is the coldest. The entire province experiences very heavy rainfall all year round, with the long rains in the earlier months of the year.

Economy 
Farming is the main economic activity in the province.

Bungoma County is sugar country, with one of the country's largest sugar factories, as well as numerous small-holder sugar mills. Maize is also grown for subsistence, alongside pearl millet and sorghum. Dairy farming is widely practised, as well as the raising of poultry. There is a small but important tourist circuit, centering on the biennial circumcision ceremonies.

Kakamega County has a mixture of both subsistence and cash crop farming, with sugar cane being the preferred medium to large scale crop. The County has two sugar factories. There is also a significant tourism industry centering on Kakamega Forest.

Busia County experiences perennial floods from the Nzoia River, and the dominant economic activity is fishing on Lake Victoria. Limited commercial farming is also practiced, mainly of sugar cane. Subsistence farming of cassava is widely practiced.

Vihiga County has large tea plantations, and is the most densely populated rural area in Kenya. Quarrying for construction materials is a significant activity in the hilly County. Dairy farming is also widely practiced in Vihiga.

Western Kenya has many large factories, including sugar processing plants (4 factories).  The largest of these is Mumias Sugar, based at Mumias, to the west of Kakamega.  This factory produces the dominant sugar brand in Kenya and is an economic success story.  Also in Western Kenya is the largest paper factory in Africa (Pan Paper Mills in Webuye) and chemical processors. Despite this, living standards are generally low and social amenities like running water and electricity are not available to the majority of the province's residents.

Counties

Districts after 2007 

Several new districts were created in 2007 in Kenya, also in Western Province:

See also
Aisere
Konjero se Ekonjero
Lwanda

References

 
Provinces of Kenya
Former provinces
2013 disestablishments in Kenya